Thala cernica is a species of small sea snail, marine gastropod mollusk in the family Costellariidae, the ribbed miters.

Description

Distribution
This species occurs in the Indian Ocean off Madagascar.

References

 Dautzenberg, Ph. (1929). Mollusques testacés marins de Madagascar. Faune des Colonies Francaises, Tome III
  Turner H. 2001. Katalog der Familie Costellariidae Macdonald, 1860. Conchbooks. 1–100 page(s): 23
 Turner, Gori & Salisbury. (2007) Vita Malacologica, supplement to Basteria 5:1–48-page(s): 36

Costellariidae
Gastropods described in 1874